Frento Vallis is a valley in the Noachis quadrangle of Mars, with a location centered at 
50.3 S and 14.5 W.  It is 277 km long and was named after the classical name for a river in Italy.

References

See also

 Geology of Mars
 HiRISE
 Vallis (planetary geology)
 Water on Mars

Valleys and canyons on Mars
Noachis quadrangle